Sula (also called Indre Solundøy ) is an island in Solund Municipality in Vestland county, Norway. The  island is the main island of the municipality. The largest village on the island is Hardbakke. The other main village area is Hersvikbygda on the northern part of the island.

The island has a ferry service from the village of Krakhella on the island to the mainland village of Rutledal in Gulen Municipality and also to the village of Losnegard on the neighboring island of Losna, immediately to the east of Sula. Just southwest of Hardbakke, there is a bridge from Sula to the neighboring island of Steinsundøyna to the west.

Media gallery

See also
List of islands of Norway

References

Islands of Vestland
Solund